Keith Michael Ginter (born May 5, 1976) is a former American Major League Baseball infielder. Ginter is a graduate of Fullerton Union High School in Fullerton, California.

College
Ginter attended and played baseball at Cypress College before transferring to Texas Tech University. During his two years at Texas Tech University, Ginter was a two-time All-American and helped the Red Raiders in NCAA Regional action.

Professional career
Ginter was drafted by the Houston Astros in 10th Round of 1998 amateur entry draft and began his professional career playing for the Auburn Doubledays of the New York–Penn League and made his first major league appearance playing for the Astros on September 20, 2000.

In September 2002, Ginter was traded along with Wayne Franklin to Milwaukee Brewers for Mark Loretta and cash.  Ginter played for the Brewers until December 2004 when he was traded to the Oakland Athletics for Nelson Cruz and Justin Lehr.  During the 2004 season, Ginter had been named National League Player of the Week.

Ginter split the  seasons between Oakland and the teams triple-A affiliate Sacramento River Cats, and spent the entire  season at triple-A.

On January 2, 2007, he was signed by Cleveland Indians to minor league contract and invited to spring training, but spent the entire  season playing for the Buffalo Bisons.

On December 13, 2007, he was signed by Boston Red Sox to minor league contract, and attended the teams spring training session but was assigned to the teams minor league camp on March 19, . He became a free agent at the end of the 2008 season and signed a minor league contract with the Chicago White Sox on January 6, 2009. He was released by the White Sox March 15, 2010.

On April 26, 2010, he was signed by the Orange County Flyers of the independent Golden Baseball League and was their starting third baseman for the 2010 season.

He is not related to Matt Ginter, a pitcher who pitched in the majors from 2000 to 2008.

Spring training incident
The gunmen then went to the next room where Aaron Miles wrestled one of them to the ground while the other one fled. The other players involved were Morgan Ensberg, Derrek Nicholson, Mike Rose, and Eric Cole.

References

External links

Baseball Reference minor league statistics
SoxProspects Biography

1976 births
Living people
People from Norwalk, California
Baseball players from California
Major League Baseball second basemen
Major League Baseball third basemen
Auburn Doubledays players
Buffalo Bisons (minor league) players
Charlotte Knights players
Cypress Chargers baseball players
Houston Astros players
Indianapolis Indians players
Jackson Generals (Texas League) players
Kissimmee Cobras players
Milwaukee Brewers players
New Orleans Zephyrs players
Oakland Athletics players
Orange County Flyers players
Pawtucket Red Sox players
Round Rock Express players
Sacramento River Cats players
Texas Tech Red Raiders baseball players
All-American college baseball players
Mat-Su Miners players